Forked Island is an unincorporated community in Vermilion Parish, Louisiana, United States. The island was severely affected by Hurricane Rita in 2005.

References 

Unincorporated communities in Vermilion Parish, Louisiana
Unincorporated communities in Louisiana